Brett Kirk (born 25 October 1976) is a former Australian rules football player of the Sydney Swans and was the AFL's International Ambassador. Kirk is currently serving as an assistant coach with the Sydney Swans.

AFL career
Kirk grew up in Albury, New South Wales. He was recruited to the Sydney Swans as a mature-aged rookie and was twice dropped from the team, but he found his way back on to the list. Kirk was regarded as "one of the toughest and most respected midfielders in the competition".

Kirk played 241 games for the Swans since making his debut in 1999, including the final 200 without missing a match. He was nominated All-Australian in 2004. Kirk won the best and fairest twice, in 2005, the year the club won the AFL premiership, and again in 2007. He was co-captain of the Swans from 2005–2010.

Kirk made his debut in Round 19 of the 1999 season against the North Melbourne Kangaroos and recorded 19 disposals and kicked 3 goals. He played a total of 12 games in his first two seasons, but cemented his place in 2001 when he played 19 games and kicked 14 goals. Kirk went on to play 18 games in 2002, and in 2003 had a break out year, in which he played all of Sydney's 24 games and recorded 140 tackles. He soon became an integral part of the engine room at the Swans. Kirk also represented Australia in International Rules against Ireland.

In 2004, Kirk took his game to another level, playing all 24 games, his season was highlighted with a 33 disposal and 7 tackle effort in a Round 15 victory over the Adelaide Crows, as well as a 30 disposal, 6 tackle and 1 goal effort in their Round 19 loss against the Kangaroos. He was rewarded with his excellent season with selection in the 2004 All-Australian team, in which he was selected on the interchange bench. Kirk also represented Australia in International rules football against Ireland. 

In 2005, Kirk became a Co-Captain of the Swans, alongside Barry Hall and Leo Barry, and played all 26 games for the Swans, highlighted with a 31 disposal 8 tackle performance against the Essendon Bombers in a Round 7 win, and a 29 disposal, 7 tackle and 1 goal effort in the Swan's Round 16 win over the Melbourne Demons. Kirk became a premiership player when the Swans defeated the West Coast Eagles by 4 points in the 2005 AFL Grand Final. He was rewarded with his first Bob Skilton Medal, as Sydney's best and fairest, in a season in which he recorded 570 disposals and laid 136 tackles, including 22 disposals and 7 tackles in their drought breaking premiership victory. 

2006 saw Kirk play all 25 games and recording 142 tackles. He recorded 10 tackles in their Round 9 win over the Hawthorn Hawks and 11 tackles in their loss over the West Coast Eagles in their Round 15 grand final rematch. He performed strongly all season, and the Swans again matched up against the Eagles in the 2006 AFL grand final , in which Kirk recorded 27 disposals and laid 9 tackles. The Swans eventually lost the decider by 1 point. Kirk won the Robert Rose Award at the 2006 AFL Players Association awards, for being voted the most courageous player in the league. 

The 2007 AFL season saw the Swans win 12 games and eventually bow out in the Elimination final against the Collingwood Magpies, Kirk played 23 games and laid 149 tackles, and had 10 or more tackles 4 times, highlighted with 13 tackles against Richmond in round 2. He also recorded 516 disposals for the season. He was rewarded with his second Bob Skilton Medal, as Sydney's best and fairest at the conclusion of the 2007 season. 

Kirk carried his consistency into the 2008 AFL season and played 24 games and racked up 539 disposals, along with 151 tackles, his highest tally in his career so far. Kirk was selected to play for the 'Dream Team' in the AFL Hall of Fame Tribute Match, in which Kirk booted a goal in the Dream Team's loss to the Victorian side. 

The 2009 AFL season saw the Swans have a somewhat disappointing season, only managing 8 wins for the season, Kirk performed consistently as always and recorded his career best of 170 tackles and recorded 14 tackles in their Round 19 win over Richmond. Kirk also racked up 468 disposals, and recorded 33 disposals against the Port Adelaide Power in Round 9. 

2010 was Brett Kirk's last season in the AFL, he recorded 397 disposals and laid 117 tackles and played his final game in the Swans Semi final loss against the Western Bulldogs. He was rewarded with the AFLPA Best Captain Award and also the AFLPA Madden Medal.

He surpassed Jared Crouch's Swans record of 194 consecutive AFL matches in the game against Geelong in round 18, 2010. He had a total of 1278 tackles in his career, which is the fourth most of any AFL player (2014). Kirk played his final and 200th consecutive game (having not missed a match since Round 14, 2002) when he faced the Western Bulldogs in the second round of the AFL finals on Saturday 11 September 2010. It is the fifth longest such streak, and is one of two by Sydney Swans players (the other being Adam Goodes) in the top 5.

He retired at the end of 2010. After retirement, Kirk was invited to join Channel 7's coverage of AFL as field commentator.

Coaching and ambassador role
In 2011, he spent six months travelling the world and spreading the word about football as the AFL's International Ambassador.

Kirk joined the Fremantle Football Club as an assistant coach at the end of 2012, working as a development and midfield coach with Ross Lyon. Prior to that, he worked at the Gold Coast Suns in a role designed to help implement a winning culture at the club. He returned to the Sydney Swans at the end of 2015 as an assistant coach under John Longmire.

Statistics

|-
|- style="background-color: #EAEAEA"
! scope="row" style="text-align:center" | 1999
|style="text-align:center;"|
| 31 || 5 || 5 || 2 || 65 || 19 || 84 || 18 || 11 || 1.0 || 0.4 || 13.0 || 3.8 || 16.8 || 3.6 || 2.2
|-
! scope="row" style="text-align:center" | 2000
|style="text-align:center;"|
| 31 || 7 || 1 || 3 || 45 || 33 || 78 || 13 || 18 || 0.1 || 0.4 || 6.4 || 4.7 || 11.1 || 1.9 || 2.6
|- style="background-color: #EAEAEA"
! scope="row" style="text-align:center" | 2001
|style="text-align:center;"|
| 31 || 19 || 14 || 8 || 130 || 101 || 231 || 56 || 39 || 0.7 || 0.4 || 6.8 || 5.3 || 12.2 || 2.9 || 2.1
|-
! scope="row" style="text-align:center" | 2002
|style="text-align:center;"|Sydney
| 31 || 18 || 6 || 2 || 96 || 137 || 233 || 39 || 78 || 0.3 || 0.1 || 5.3 || 7.6 || 12.9 || 2.2 || 4.3
|- style="background-color: #EAEAEA"
! scope="row" style="text-align:center" | 2003
|style="text-align:center;"|
| 31 || 24 || 9 || 5 || 168 || 209 || 377 || 44 || 140 || 0.4 || 0.2 || 7.0 || 8.7 || 15.7 || 1.8 || 5.8
|-
! scope="row" style="text-align:center" | 2004
|style="text-align:center;"|
| 31 || 24 || 10 || 11 || 236 || 237 || 473 || 54 || 127 || 0.4 || 0.5 || 9.8 || 9.9 || 19.7 || 2.3 || 5.3
|- style="background-color: #EAEAEA"
! scope="row" style="text-align:center;" | 2005
|style="text-align:center;"|
| 31 || 26 || 6 || 6 || 299 || 271 || 570 || 68 || 136 || 0.2 || 0.2 || 11.5 || 10.4 || 21.9 || 2.6 || 5.2
|-
! scope="row" style="text-align:center" | 2006
|style="text-align:center;"|
| 31 || 25 || 8 || 13 || 285 || 211 || 496 || 99 || 142 || 0.3 || 0.5 || 11.4 || 8.4 || 19.8 || 4.0 || 5.7
|- style="background-color: #EAEAEA"
! scope="row" style="text-align:center" | 2007
|style="text-align:center;"|
| 31 || 23 || 8 || 5 || 223 || 293 || 516 || 80 || 149 || 0.3 || 0.2 || 9.7 || 12.7 || 22.4 || 3.5 || 6.5
|-
! scope="row" style="text-align:center" | 2008
|style="text-align:center;"|
| 31 || 24 || 9 || 12 || 257 || 282 || 539 || 71 || 151 || 0.4 || 0.5 || 10.7 || 11.8 || 22.5 || 3.0 || 6.3
|- style="background-color: #EAEAEA"
! scope="row" style="text-align:center" | 2009
|style="text-align:center;"|
| 31 || 22 || 8 || 4 || 173 || 295 || 468 || 44 || 170 || 0.4 || 0.2 || 7.9 || 13.4 || 21.3 || 2.0 || 7.7
|-
! scope="row" style="text-align:center" | 2010
|style="text-align:center;"|
| 31 || 24 || 12 || 4 || 161 || 236 || 397 || 68 || 117 || 0.5 || 0.2 || 6.7 || 9.8 || 16.5 || 2.8 || 4.9
|- class="sortbottom"
! colspan=3| Career
! 241
! 96
! 75
! 2138
! 2324
! 4462
! 654
! 1278
! 0.4
! 0.3
! 8.9
! 9.6
! 18.5
! 2.7
! 5.3
|}

Personal life
In 2008, Kirk was given the honour of meeting with the Dalai Lama during his Australian tour in which he presented the Dalai Lama with a signed Swans guernsey.  Kirk is known as a practicing Buddhist and has a tattoo of a Buddhist symbol on his back.  When the young Swan Dan Hannebery seemed anxious, Kirk recommended that he do some meditation and read The Power of Now and A New Earth by Eckhart Tolle.

References

External links

Captain Kirk leads next generation – Sydney Morning Herald

1976 births
Living people
Sydney Swans players
Sydney Swans Premiership players
Bob Skilton Medal winners
All-Australians (AFL)
North Albury Football Club players
Australian rules footballers from Albury
Converts to Buddhism
Australia international rules football team players
One-time VFL/AFL Premiership players